Remote ID, or formally Part 89 in Title 14 of the Code of Federal Regulations, Remote Identification of Unmanned Aircraft, is a United States regulation instituted by the Federal Aviation Administration that requires unmanned aerial systems (UAS) to broadcast via radio location information about the airborne vehicle and a unique serial number for identification purposes. Some have referred to it as a "digital license plate" for drones and unmanned aerial vehicles (UAV).

The rule was announced on December 28, 2020, and is effective 60 days from the expected publication date in the Federal Register in January 2021. Operators of UAS have thirty months to comply with the regulation and manufacturers have 18 months after the publication date to comply.

The technical specification was developed with input from Airbus, AirMap, Amazon, Intel, OneSky, Skyward, T-Mobile, and Wing.

On March 17, 2021, RaceDayQuads, an online store selling FPV drone equipment, announced its founder Tyler Brennan had filed an appeal against the FAA for the Remote ID rule. On July 29, 2022, the RaceDayQuads appeal was denied by the United States Court of Appeals for the District of Columbia Circuit.

References 

Federal Aviation Administration